The Academy at Swift River, also known as ASR, was a coeducational therapeutic boarding school for teenagers, located in Plainfield and Cummington, Massachusetts. Established in 1997 and closed in 2013, it was a part of the Aspen Education Group, which in turn is owned by Bain Capital's CRC health group.

The school's student population was described as "bright but underachieving kids" with a variety of behavioral problems. The majority of students use prescribed psychiatric medications.  ASR was in session year-round and offered a college preparatory curriculum for high school grades 9 to 12. Total enrollment was about 55 students.

The school was the focus of the 2005 book What It Takes To Pull Me Through: Why Teenagers Get in Trouble and How Four of Them Got Out by journalist David Marcus.

Shane Reardon, son of major league baseball pitcher Jeff Reardon, graduated from ASR with honors, but later died from a drug overdose at age 20 in the year of 2004.

In July 2013, Aspen Education Group announced that it would close the school later that summer.

References

Further reading
 David L. Marcus (2005), What It Takes To Pull Me Through: Why Teenagers Get in Trouble and How Four of Them Got Out, Houghton Mifflin, 

Therapeutic community
Schools in Hampshire County, Massachusetts
Bain Capital companies
Boarding schools in Massachusetts
Therapeutic boarding schools in the United States
1997 establishments in Massachusetts
2013 disestablishments in Massachusetts